The Lagos railway station is the western terminus of the Algarve line, which serves the city of Lagos, in the Faro District, in Portugal. It opened on the 7th of July 1922. The building was replaced by a new structure in 2003.

References 

Railway stations in Portugal
Railway stations opened in 1922
Railway stations opened in 2003